Association Sportive de Saint-Étienne Loire, commonly known as ASSE or simply Saint-Étienne, is a professional football club based in Saint-Étienne in Auvergne-Rhône-Alpes, France. The club is the women's side of the French football club of the same name, and was founded in 1977 under the name Racing Club de Saint-Étienne. The current name was adopted following the 2008–09 season as the club RC Saint-Étienne merged with their men's side.

Saint-Étienne plays its home matches at the Stade Salif-Keita in Saint-Étienne which has a capacity of 1,000 spectators. They are coached by Hervé Didier.

Players

Current squad

Former notable players
 Karima Benameur
 Delphine Blanc
 Camille Catala
 Laura Gandonou
 Méline Gérard
 Kheira Hamraoui
 Jessica Houara
 Michèle Madeleine Ngono Mani
 Anne-Marie Bănuță
 Anne-Laure Perrot
 Fanny Tenret
 Sabrina Viguier

Honours

Domestic
Coupe de France
 Winners (1): 2011,
 Runner-up (1) 2013,

References

External links
  

 
Women
Women's football clubs in France
Association football clubs established in 2009
Division 1 Féminine clubs
2009 establishments in France
Saint-Étienne w